"Amnesia" is a song by American house DJ Ian Carey and Rosette featuring Timbaland and Brasco. It was released in January 2012 as a single, reaching number 34 in Canada. It was certified Gold in Canada in 2013.

Track listing
Digital single
 "Amnesia" (Club Mix) – 4:46
 "Amnesia" (Extended Mix) – 4:33
 "Amnesia" (Cazzette Another Sugar Hunt Mix) – 5:00
 "Amnesia" (Firebeatz Remix) – 7:03
 "Amnesia" (Ziggy Stardust Remix) – 6:00
 "Amnesia" (Ralph Good & Chris Gant Remix) – 5:56
 "Amnesia" (Yves V Remix) – 6:24

Charts

Certifications
On February 22, 2013, the song was certified Gold in Canada.

References

2012 singles
Ian Carey songs
Timbaland songs
2012 songs